Cosmopterix phyllostachysea is a moth of the family Cosmopterigidae. It is known from China (Jiangxi) and Japan.

The length of the forewings is about 6 mm.

The larvae have been recorded feeding on Poaceae species in China and on Phyllostachys bambusoides in Japan. They mine the leaves of their host plant. The mine has the form of a linear-blotch mine. The linear starts small, but gradually widens. The last instar larvae create an oval chamber. It later makes a smaller overwintering chamber of silk-like fiber within this bigger chamber. After overwintering, the larvae begin feeding on the mesophyll in March.

References

phyllostachysea
Moths of Japan